The 1976–77 season was the Portland Trail Blazers' 7th season in the National Basketball Association (NBA). The revamped Blazers would end up getting off to a terrific start winning 22 of their first 31 games. The Blazers won their last 5 games to post a record of 49–33. The Blazers made the playoffs for the first time in franchise history and proceeded to stampede through the postseason. By the time the Blazers had made it to the 1977 NBA Finals, the city of Portland was truly in the grips of "Blazermania". After losing the first two games of the championship series at Philadelphia, the Trail Blazers won four in a row to bring the trophy to Portland. The championship capped the team's first winning season. The Blazers had a remarkable 45–6 record at home, which included a perfect 10–0 mark in the playoffs.

, this remains the only NBA championship in Blazers franchise history, though they made NBA Finals appearances in 1990 and 1992, losing to the Detroit Pistons and Chicago Bulls, respectively.

Offseason

NBA Draft

Note: This is not a complete list; only the first three rounds are covered, as well as any other picks by the franchise who played at least one NBA game.

ABA Dispersal Draft

The American Basketball Association joined the NBA with the ABA–NBA merger in 1976. Of the teams remaining in the ABA, four joined the NBA. The two teams, the Kentucky Colonels and Spirits of St. Louis, which folded had their players assigned to a dispersal draft for draft purposes.

Roster

Regular season

Just months earlier, the American Basketball Association had ended its ninth and last campaign and the two leagues combined. Despite the changes, it would become the season of Bill Walton and the Portland Trail Blazers. Walton's college performance led to predictions that Walton would be pro basketball's next great player. Yet those dreams went largely unfulfilled because of a series of foot injuries that hampered him. But in the 1977 playoffs, a healthy Walton and his teammates found a chemistry that enabled them to beat one of the most talented pro teams ever assembled.
For Walton, it wasn't a question of wanting to play but of being able to. Injuries repeatedly interrupted his progress as a pro player. On the court, when he was healthy, he was a key contributor. He missed 17 games over the 1976–77 season; the Blazers lost 12 of them. With Walton in the lineup, the Blazers were 44–21, and their .677 winning percentage during those games was the best in the league.
The dispersal of ABA players had been particularly beneficial to the Blazers. Maurice Lucas was simply the most dominating power forward in the game, and his arrival only boosted Walton's effectiveness in the frontcourt. Lucas led the team in scoring at 20.2 points per game and averaged better than 11 rebounds. Coming over with Lucas from the ABA was lead guard Dave Twardzik. He had four pro seasons with the Virginia Squires of the ABA and was a starter in Ramsay's system. Another key contributor was Lionel Hollins, a second-year player out of Arizona State who averaged nearly 15 points per game.

Season standings

z – clinched division title
y – clinched division title
x – clinched playoff spot

Record vs. opponents

Season schedule

Playoffs

|- align="center" bgcolor="#ccffcc"
| 1
| April 12
| Chicago
| W 96–83
| Maurice Lucas (29)
| Bill Walton (9)
| Bill Walton (6)
| Memorial Coliseum12,774
| 1–0
|- align="center" bgcolor="#ffcccc"
| 2
| April 15
| @ Chicago
| L 104–107
| Bill Walton (24)
| Bill Walton (17)
| Bob Gross (7)
| Chicago Stadium20,000
| 1–1
|- align="center" bgcolor="#ccffcc"
| 3
| April 17
| Chicago
| W 106–98
| Bob Gross (26)
| Bill Walton (11)
| Lionel Hollins (9)
| Memorial Coliseum12,520
| 2–1
|-

|- align="center" bgcolor="#ccffcc"
| 1
| April 20
| @ Denver
| W 101–100
| Maurice Lucas (23)
| Maurice Lucas (13)
| Bill Walton (6)
| McNichols Sports Arena17,995
| 1–0
|- align="center" bgcolor="#ffcccc"
| 2
| April 23
| @ Denver
| L 110–121
| Maurice Lucas (29)
| Bill Walton (16)
| Bill Walton (10)
| McNichols Sports Arena17,975
| 1–1
|- align="center" bgcolor="#ccffcc"
| 3
| April 24
| Denver
| W 110–106
| Bill Walton (26)
| Bill Walton (13)
| Walton, Twardzik (5)
| Memorial Coliseum12,736
| 2–1
|- align="center" bgcolor="#ccffcc"
| 4
| April 26
| Denver
| W 105–96
| Bob Gross (25)
| Bill Walton (11)
| Bob Gross (6)
| Memorial Coliseum12,930
| 3–1
|- align="center" bgcolor="#ffcccc"
| 5
| May 1
| @ Denver
| L 105–114 (OT)
| Lionel Hollins (19)
| Walton, Gross (14)
| Hollins, Gross (7)
| McNichols Sports Arena17,517
| 3–2
|- align="center" bgcolor="#ccffcc"
| 6
| May 2
| Denver
| W 108–92
| Johnny Davis (25)
| Bill Walton (12)
| Bill Walton (9)
| Memorial Coliseum12,924
| 4–2
|-

|- align="center" bgcolor="#ccffcc"
| 1
| May 6
| @ Los Angeles
| W 121–109
| Maurice Lucas (28)
| Maurice Lucas (15)
| three players tied (6)
| The Forum16,975
| 1–0
|- align="center" bgcolor="#ccffcc"
| 2
| May 8
| @ Los Angeles
| W 99–97
| Lionel Hollins (31)
| Bill Walton (17)
| Lionel Hollins (9)
| The Forum15,192
| 2–0
|- align="center" bgcolor="#ccffcc"
| 3
| May 10
| Los Angeles
| W 102–97
| Walton, Lucas (22)
| Bill Walton (15)
| Bill Walton (9)
| Memorial Coliseum12,926
| 3–0
|- align="center" bgcolor="#ccffcc"
| 4
| May 13
| Los Angeles
| W 105–101
| Maurice Lucas (26)
| Bill Walton (14)
| Walton, Gross (6)
| Memorial Coliseum12,904
| 4–0
|-

|- align="center" bgcolor="#ffcccc"
| 1
| May 22
| @ Philadelphia
| L 101–107
| Bill Walton (28)
| Bill Walton (20)
| Hollins, Davis (6)
| Spectrum18,276
| 0–1
|- align="center" bgcolor="#ffcccc"
| 2
| May 26
| @ Philadelphia
| L 89–107
| Bill Walton (17)
| Bill Walton (16)
| Bob Gross (4)
| Spectrum18,276
| 0–2
|- align="center" bgcolor="#ccffcc"
| 3
| May 29
| Philadelphia
| W 129–107
| Maurice Lucas (27)
| Bill Walton (18)
| Bill Walton (9)
| Memorial Coliseum12,923
| 1–2
|- align="center" bgcolor="#ccffcc"
| 4
| May 31
| Philadelphia
| W 130–98
| Lionel Hollins (25)
| Bill Walton (13)
| Bill Walton (7)
| Memorial Coliseum12,913
| 2–2
|- align="center" bgcolor="#ccffcc"
| 5
| June 3
| @ Philadelphia
| W 110–104
| Bob Gross (25)
| Bill Walton (24)
| Johnny Davis (8)
| Spectrum18,276
| 3–2
|- align="center" bgcolor="#ccffcc"
| 6
| June 5
| Philadelphia
| W 109–107
| Hollins, Walton (20)
| Bob Gross (23)
| Bill Walton (7)
| Memorial Coliseum12,951
| 4–2
|-

NBA Finals

The Finals opened in the Spectrum on Sunday, May 22. The 76ers seemed unbeatable after the first two games. Erving opened Game 1 with a stupendous dunk off the opening tip. He finished with 33 points and Collins had 30 as Philadelphia won 107–101. The Blazers were rattled enough to commit 34 turnovers. Walton finished with 28 points and 20 rebounds.

In Game 2 four nights later, the Sixers won handily, 107–89. Jones and Dawkins handled Walton easily, while the Sixers dominated in the second quarter, scoring 14 points in one three-minute stretch on their way to a 61–43 halftime lead. The game became very physical with about five minutes left. First, Portland's Lloyd Neal and McGinnis squared off, followed by Lucas and Erving trading elbows.

In Game 3, played on Sunday, May 29, Lucas strode directly to the Philadelphia bench, then startled everybody, including Dawkins, by sticking out his hand for a shake. The Blazers had a high scoring attack to win the game. Lucas contributed 27 points and 12 rebounds. Walton had nine assists, 20 points, and 18 rebounds. Twardzik, too, had returned to speed, driving the Portland offense along to a 42-point fourth quarter. They won 129–107, closing the series gap to 2–1.

In Game 4, Portland opened up a quick 17-point lead, then cruised to a 130–98 win. Walton was sent to the bench with five fouls in the third. With a little more than eight minutes left in Game 5, Portland led 91–69 and the crowd was headed home. Erving rallied the Sixers to make it respectable at the end, 110–104. He had managed 37 points in the game. Gross scored 25 points to lead the Blazers, while Lucas had 20 with 13 rebounds. Walton finished with 24 rebounds and 14 points.

In the sixth and deciding game, Walton had 20 points, 23 rebounds, eight blocks and seven assists. The Portland lead was still 12 with half of the fourth quarter left when Erving led his teammates on one final run. At the four-minute mark, the lead was cut to four, 102–98. McGinnis hit a jumper, and the lead was only two points with 18 seconds left. The Sixers needed a turnover, and they finally got it from McGinnis, who was able to force a jump ball with Gross. With eight seconds remaining, Erving put up a jumper in the lane but missed. Free got the ball and lofted a baseline shot and missed too. With a second left, McGinnis tried to force a seventh and deciding game but he missed. Walton knocked the loose ball away and ripped off his jersey, and hurled it into the crowd.

Player statistics

Season

Playoffs

Awards and records
 Bill Walton, All-NBA Second Team
 Bill Walton, NBA Finals Most Valuable Player Award

References

External links
 Blazers on Database Basketball
 Blazers on Reference Basketball

Portland Trail Blazers seasons
Portland
NBA championship seasons
Western Conference (NBA) championship seasons
Portland Trail Blazers 1976
Portland Trail Blazers 1976
Portland
Portland